Reviving the Islamic Spirit (RIS) is an annual Islamic conference typically held during the winter holiday season in Toronto, Ontario, Canada.

The first conference was held in 2001, and has since become one of North America's largest Islamic conferences, alongside the ISNA convention in the United States. The conference has grown from 3,500 attendees in its first year to over 20,000 in 2011, making it the largest Islamic conference in Canada.  Attendees and speakers attend from around the world, including the United States, Europe and the Middle East. In May 2010, RIS held its first American conference in Long Beach, California. 
Following the second U.S. edition at the Long Beach Convention Center on Memorial Day weekend the conference was discontinued.

Overview
The format of the conference typically consists of a series of lectures over three days, generally structured around a specific central theme. Each year distinguished speakers, including both Islamic scholars and non-Muslims, are invited to lecture based on the selected theme of the conference. Previous conference themes have included the life of the prophet Muhammad, Canadian-Muslim identity, and Islamic civilization.

Concert

A concert has been held at the end of the conference almost every year, usually consisting of nasheed (Islamic music) or performances by Muslim musicians. Main performers who have headlined the concert include: Junaid Jamshed, Sami Yusuf, Maher Zain, Najam Sheraz, Raihan, Native Deen and Danish hip-hop group Outlandish.

Criticism and accusation of religious fundamentalism

The conference has invited some figures like Tariq Ramadan and Bilal Philips. Even Justin Trudeau has participated. Trudeau was criticized later by some media outlets, and other Jewish and Muslim groups, and as well by some members of his own party because they argued that the conference was problematic and had indirect connection with Hamas and that there were aspects of religious radicalism. Among other, there was a sponsor, IRFAN, which was said had sent suspicious funds to Hamas, apparently about 15 million dollars. The sponsor denied the allegations, but decided to withdraw from the conference in order not to cause more controversy. Trudeau himself rejected the criticism.

Notable speakers
Two scholars have made an appearance at the conference every year since it began: Zaid Shakir and Hamza Yusuf except the 2017 conference, which Hamza Yusuf was unable to attend. Other notable speakers who have appeared over the years include:

Islamic organizations based in Canada
Islam in Toronto